Hyperolius cinereus,  Monard's reed frog or ashy reed frog, is a species of frog in the family Hyperoliidae.
It is found in Angola and possibly Democratic Republic of the Congo.
Its natural habitats are rivers, swamps, freshwater marshes, and intermittent freshwater marshes.

References

cinereus
Frogs of Africa
Amphibians of Angola
Endemic fauna of Angola
Amphibians described in 1937
Taxa named by Albert Monard
Taxonomy articles created by Polbot